Marlene Kalf (previously Zapf; born 6 January 1990) is a German handball player for TuS Metzingen and the German national team.

She made her international debut on 28 November 2010 against Austria.

References

External links

1990 births
Living people
German female handball players
People from Landau
Sportspeople from Rhineland-Palatinate
20th-century German women
21st-century German women